Thujsa Jawira (Aymara thujsa smelling, jawira river, "smelling river", also spelled Tujsa Jahuira) is a river in the La Paz Department in Bolivia. It is a left tributary of the Desaguadero River. The confluence is in the Caquiaviri Municipality of the Pacajes Province south of the village of Nasa Q'ara (Nazacara).

See also 
 Jach'a Jawira
 Qala Jawira

References

Rivers of La Paz Department (Bolivia)